Brentford is a railway station in the town of Brentford, in Hounslow, London. It is on the Hounslow Loop Line and in Travelcard Zone 4. The station and all trains serving it are operated by South Western Railway. It was the main station for Brentford F.C.'s former ground Griffin Park, 400 metres east.  The modest High Street of the suburb of Brentford (characterized by wide-ranging businesses and light industrial parks) is 300 metres south-east.

Services 
The typical off-peak service from the station in trains per hour is:
 4 direct to Waterloo via 
 2 circuitously to Waterloo via  and Richmond
 2 to 
The Sunday service is one train per hour each way: London Waterloo – Woking and the same serving Waterloo, Brentford, Twickenham, Kingston, Wimbledon and Waterloo and all intermediate stops each way.

History

Brentford railway station was opened in 1849 by the London and South Western Railway (LSWR) in a period of mainly passenger use. An unlinked perpendicular line, the Brentford Dock line operated between 1859 and 1964, mainly for goods and waste transfer.  The Dock Line between 1860 and 1942 ran a passenger service into passenger terminus Brentford (GWR) railway station.

Between 1950 and 1980 Brentford station was named Brentford Central station.  When multi-national pharmaceutical and retail company Glaxo Smith Kline opened its Global HQ 500 metres west, GSK House in 2001 after two years of construction, it contributed towards modernisation of the station.

Between 22 May 2000 and 28 September 2002, the station was served by the London Crosslink service provided by Anglia Railways.

Connections
London Buses routes 195 and E8 – E denotes Ealing – serve the station. Bus E2 stops nearby.

References

External links 

Brentford, London
Railway stations in the London Borough of Hounslow
Former London and South Western Railway stations
Railway stations in Great Britain opened in 1849
Railway stations served by South Western Railway
1849 establishments in England